The Düben family, originally Düben, is a Swedish noble family of German origin, introduced at the Swedish house of nobility. The Düben family is predominantly famous for its contributions to music – the Düben collection – and its ties to the late reigning House of Holstein-Gottorp. The "Düben collection" is preserved at the Uppsala University Library. Family members use different surnames; the ennobled ones and their descendants use a nobiliary particle in their surnames, while the un-ennobled do not.

Overview
The first recorded member of the Düben family who used the name "Düben" was Michael Düben. His grandson Andreas Düben came to Sweden in 1624, where he served as organist at the German Church in Stockholm. The most prominent figures in the von Düben family are Emerentia von Düben, lady-in-waiting, the favorite of Ulrika Eleonora, Queen of Sweden and Gustaf Düben, organist and composer. The latter was the main contributor to the Düben collection.

Family tree

 Andreas Düben (1597–1662)
 Gustaf Düben (1624–1690)
 Gustaf von Düben (1659–1726)
 Carl Gustaf von Düben (1700–1758)
 Ulrik Vilhelm von Düben (1739–1817)
 Gustaf Henrik von Düben (1777–1833)
 Gustaf von Düben (1822–1892) ∞ Lotten von Bahr (1828–1915)
 Emerentia von Düben (1669–1743)
 Joachim von Düben the Elder (1671–1730)
 Anders von Düben (1673–1738)
 Joachim von Düben the Younger (1708–1786)
 Fredrika Eleonora von Düben (1738–1808)
 Henrik Jakob von Düben (1733–1805)
 Anders Gustaf von Düben (1785–1846)
 August von Düben (1813–1867)
 Gunilla von Düben (1862–1923)
 Vilhelm von Düben (1816–1897)
 Edvard von Düben (1865–1930)
 Viktor von Düben (1818–1867)
 Cesar von Düben (1819–1888)
 Ingeborg von Düben

References

Cited sources

External links
Genealogy of von Düben

Swedish noble families
Swedish families of German ancestry
Families of classical musicians